The Domestic Twenty20 formerly known as and Stanbic Bank Twenty20  the Metropolitan Bank Twenty20  is the domestic Twenty20 cricket competition in Zimbabwe. It was formed in 2007 and maintained by Zimbabwe Cricket. It features all the national and domestic players from Zimbabwe and some international stars. Recently, the tournament has risen in profile with some high-quality cricket, and the attraction of major international stars such as Brian Lara, Ryan Sidebottom, Chris Gayle, Shaun Tait, Ian Harvey, and Dirk Nannes. The tournament particularly rose in profile after the reorganization of cricket in Zimbabwe. It was so successful in the 2009–10 season (the inaugural edition after the rename of the tournament) that the tournament was again held in November. In 2009–10, a domestic-cricket record 7500 spectators came into the Harare Sports Club to see the final between Mountaineers and Mashonaland Eagles. It was most recently sponsored by Stanbic Bank (Uganda) Limited.

Teams

Former Teams

2006–09 seasons
  Northerns
  Easterns
  Southerns
  Westerns
  Centrals

2009–10 season
 Desert Vipers (Namibia national cricket team)

Tournament history

2006–07 season
 Winner: Southerns
 Runner-up: Easterns
 Official Website: Metropolitan Bank Twenty20 2006/07 on BRMTaylor.com
 Dates: 30 March 2007 – 1 April 2007
The inaugural edition of the Metropolitan Bank Twenty20 series was held in early 2007, however the scorecards were never made available, so for the players that participated in this tournament, their statistics would not have been officially recorded.

Many of the countries top cricketers were not able to take part in the tournament as they were competing in the ICC World Cup in the West Indies, however many of the second tier players such as Timycen Maruma – who had played in Zimbabwe's only official Twenty20 to date, against the Eagles in South Africa – and Blessing Mahwire did take part.

The tournament took place in the eastern border city of Mutare.

2007–08 season
 Winner: Easterns
 Runner-up: Westerns
 Dates: 19 March 2008 – 21 March 2008
 Official Website: Metropolitan Bank Twenty20 2007/08 at ESPNCricinfo
 Main Article: 2007–08 Metropolitan Bank Twenty20

The 2008 season was held between 19 and 21 March 2008. The tournament kicked off the provincial domestic season, and featured all of the countries top cricketers. Easterns were the dominant team of the tournament, and there was some concern that Zimbabwe Cricket had placed the countries top players, such as Hamilton Masakadza, Prosper Utseya, Stuart Matsikenyeri and Timycen Maruma, in this team to show there is depth outside of the urban centres. However, Northerns province, who featured Brendan Taylor, Elton Chigumbura, Ray Price, Tatenda Taibu and Graeme Cremer, were arguably a stronger side, and they didn't make it to the finals, suggesting perhaps that the claims were unfounded.

The tournament featured several names from the past, such as fast bowler Ian Nicolson (Southerns), batsman Malcolm Waller (Centrals) and bowler Brian Vitori (Southerns). However, there were several noticeable missing faces, such as Khawaluni Ntuil, the Westerns fast bowler, Freedom Takarusenga, the Westerns all-rounder, and Kyle Jarvis, the under 19's fast bowler who was unlucky to miss out on a place in the Northerns squad.

The three-day tournament was held in Harare, with matches being shared between Harare Sports Club and the Country Club (Zimbabwe Cricket Academy). The first 2 days saw four matches being played, two in the morning with one at each venue, and two in the afternoon with one at each venue again. The final day had a regular morning routine, but instead of the typical two afternoon matches, it was just the final match at Harare Sports Club.

Easterns maintained their increasing stranglehold in domestic cricket with a 7-run win over Westerns at Harare Sports Club, Harare. Eastern's total of 142/9 was almost entirely down to Hamilton Masakadza's 57-ball 82 not out, and the partnership with his younger brother Shingirai Masakadza, was the only partnership of note. Westerns were on course when Keith Dabengwa (42) and Greg Strydom (38) were adding 62 for the third wicket but Prosper Utseya then put the brakes on the innings and the last five wickets fell for 27 runs. Easterns now had won all the major tournaments: The Logan Cup, The Faithwear Cup, and the Metropolitan Bank Twenty20. Unsurprisingly, Hamilton Masakadza was named the Man of the Match and the Man of the Tournament.

After the tournament, Steven Price wrote on Cricinfo from Harare that the poor standards of cricket had blighted Zimbabwe's Twenty20 domestic competition.

 For more information on squads and star players for this tournament, see: BRMTaylor

2008–09 season
 Champions: Westerns
 Runners-up: Northerns
 Dates: 13 May 2009 – 16 May 2009
 Official Website: Metropolitan Bank Twenty20 2009 on ESPNCricinfo
After two disappointing Logan Cup and Faithwear campaigns, Westerns came to life in the Metropolitan Bank Twenty20 tournament for 2008–09. This season all of the matches were played in Bulawayo, split between Queens Sports Club and Bulawayo Athletic Club. The home ground advantage worked in Westerns favour – they won the title in a gripping four run win over Northerns in the final.

Mark Vermeulen was the player of the tournament, and playing in all seven matches he was comfortably the leading run scorer. His 108 for Westerns against Centrals was the highest of the series. Elton Chigumbura, the Northerns captain, was the only other century maker, his average boosting 103 not out also came against Centrals.

The big name bowlers didn't make an impact in this tournament. The biggest name of all – Ray Price – did not play a single match. The domestic fast bowlers were the most successful, with Trevor Garwe leading the way with 13 wickets at 9.15. Njabulo Ncube and Michael Chinouya took 10 wickets each. For economy rate, leg spinner Graeme Cremer was in a league of his own. His 6 wickets came at 21.16, but he conceded just 4.53 runs per over. Nobody else conceded under 5 an over, Prosper Utseya was the second most economical with an average of 5.52 runs coming from his overs.

It was widely agreed that Bulawayo did a fine job hosting the tournament. The crowd came alive and ran onto the field when Westerns completed their victory in the final. As a result of this and ZC's plan to take cricket to other parts of the country, Bulawayo was named host for the entire Bangladesh tour of Zimbabwe in August 2009.

Northerns and Westerns won through to the final of Zimbabwe's domestic Twenty20 competition. The two teams only won three of their six matches but finished well clear of third-placed Centrals; Easterns, who only last week won the Logan Cup, finished bottom of the pile.

Westerns, who finished bottom in the Logan Cup without a win, had Mark Vermeulen to thank for their reversal of fortune. Returning after a troubled few years when it seemed he would never play at a representative level again, he was by a long margin the leading run-scorer, with 289 runs at 48.16.

He also scored one of only two hundreds – 108 in a remarkable tied game against Centrals – with the other coming from Northerns' Elton Chigumbura.

In the final, Western's victory was largely possible due to the efforts of spinner Mbekezeli Mabuza who took enthralling figures of 5/14. After Westerns had been bowled out for 116 mostly by Trevor Garwe (who was also the leading wicket-taker in this tournament) who took 4–23, Mbekezeli, along with Njabulo Ncube (who provided the key strike) dismantled the Northerns batting line-up to bring victory to their team by four runs. The cricket-starved Bulawayo fans, who had cheered Westerns the whole afternoon, ran onto the field to congratulate their players. Westerns walked away with a trophy and $1000 in cash. Vermeulen, who scored a century and a half century picked up the tournament's best batsman award and got another accolade for the most sixes – 15. Garwe and Mpofu shared the best bowler award.

 For more information on squads and star players for this tournament, see: BRMTaylor

2009–10 season
 Winner: Mountaineers
 Runners-up: Mashonaland Eagles
 Official Website: 2009/10 Stanbic Bank 20 Series on ESPNCricinfo
 Main Article: 2009–10 Stanbic Bank 20 Series
The tournament was renamed as the Stanbic Bank 20 Series. Stanbic Bank (Uganda) Limited was the new sponsors. This was after the reorganization of Zimbabwean cricket and as a result, new franchises started taking part in the competition. They are Mashonaland Eagles (formerly Northerns), Southern Rocks (formerly Southerns), Mountaineers (formerly Easterns), Matabeleland Tuskers (formerly Westerns), and Mid West Rhinos (formerly Centrals). In addition, the Desert Vipers also participated as a sixth team. Craig Williams captained the side.
  
Mountaineers was easily the strongest team in the tournament final, but they were quite shaky in the group stage. Among the 5 matches they played, they won 3 and lost 2. Stronger than them was Mashonaland Eagles, who had finished first in the pool. Particularly effective against them was Eagle's bowler Ray Price who downed them by 82 runs at Harare taking remarkable figures of 5/12 in just 17 deliveries finishing off the game by the stumping of Natsai Mushangwe.

Mountaineers, however, brought their "A" game to the final. They put their disaster of the previous morning by beating their heavily favored opponents by a massive nine wickets. After bowling out their vaunted opponents for just 105 with Greg Smith taking 3/11 and Prosper Utseya 3/24, they cruised to the target as renowned internationals and former schoolmates Hamilton Masakadza (64*) and Tatenda Taibu (37*) took their team to the inaugural Stanbic Bank 20 Series title.

Despite all this, perhaps the most mind-blowing was Desert Vipers's performance. Coming into the tournament from the minnow cricketing nation of Namibia, nobody had much expectations on Namibia. However, they exceeded all expectations to finish third first in the group stage, then defeating the much more vaunted Matabeleland Tuskers (who won the tournament just a season back in 2008–09 as Westerns) by 31 runs. After the Vipers were restricted to 126/7 (despite Raymond van Schoor scoring 46), with Christopher Mpofu taking 2/26, Tuskers were bowled out for 91 (Tawanda Mupariwa's 31 proved to be the highest score of the innings), with Louis Klazinga taking 2/13 and Dirk Viljoen 2/14.

There was also another record set during the final. The final at Harare Sports Club between the Mountaineers and Eagles attracted an audience of 7500, which is the biggest attendance ever for a domestic match in living memory. As a result, Zimbabwe Cricket officially expressed its delight at the record turn-outs.

A number of former players and overseas players were contracted by the franchises specifically for the tournament. Anthony Ireland and Ian Harvey appeared for the Southern Rocks, Dougie Marillier for Mash Eagles, Andy Blignaut for Matabeleland Tuskers, Greg Smith for the Mountaineers and Darren Stevens and Ollie Rayner for Kwekwe's MidWest Rhinos. So successful was this edition that a second edition was staged in November that same year.

2010–11 season
 Champions: Mashonaland Eagles
 Runners-up: Mid West Rhinos
 Official Website: 2010/11 Stanbic Bank 20 Series at ESPNCricinfo
 Main Article: 2010–11 Stanbic Bank 20 Series
The tournament was staged in November 2010 following the success of the previous tournament in February. This edition of the tournament started with a bang. In a bid to win the tournament, Southern Rocks signed both former West Indian legend Brian Lara (who holds the record for the highest ever Test cricket score of 400*), and a former English deadly fast bowler named Ryan Sidebottom. This not only raised the standard of cricket played in the tournament, but increased its profile to the rest of the cricketing world. A number of other players were also attracted in the tournament, for example, Netherlands and Essex all-rounder Ryan ten Doeschate, Nick Compton, Liam Dawson, Andrew Hall, Paul Horton, and Lou Vincent. Grant Flower also made his comeback to playing competitive matches in Zimbabwe, as captain of Mashonaland Eagles.

Lara's presence was immense, and he scored a half-century on his Twenty20 debut, top-scoring with 65 for the Rocks and then scored a further 34 runs from 2 innings before he left, citing "commitments elsewhere". The Rocks eventually finished third due to brilliant performances by their young opener Sikandar Raza, who was turning into a T20 specialist. Eventual champions Mashonaland Eagles was the strongest by finishing at the top of the pool. The previous year's champions, Mountaineers finished bottom of the lot, thus getting out of contention for the title.

In the 1st Semi-Final, eventual champions Eagles held their nerves to secure a place in the Stanbic Bank 20 Final. After bowling out opponents Matabeleland Tuskers for 70, they themselves were in a position of being bowled out for lower than that, as the last-wicket pair of Ray Price and Douglas Hondo coming in with six still required, and hit the winning runs. The Eagles bowlers had done their job by skittling Tuskers for 70, but it soon became clear the chase wasn't going to be easy. Keegan Meth and Chris Mpofu took two wickets apiece as the Eagles fell to 11 for 4 in the fifth over and between them their eight overs cost 18 runs. Ryan ten Doeschate held the innings together with 26 off 47 balls – more 50-over than 20-over pace – but when he fell 13 and Greg Lamb followed for a duck it was a nerve-jangling conclusion. In the other semi-final, Lou Vincent and Vusi Sibanda combined in a commanding partnership of 139 in 16 overs to guide Mid West Rhinos into the final with an eight-wicket victory against Southern Rocks. The third-wicket pair ensured the early loss of both openers didn't become a major problem as they knocked off the 152-run target with ease. Sibanda cracked five sixes in his 60 while Vincent cleared the ropes twice as he hit an unbeaten 75 off 55 balls. Tatenda Taibu, the Rocks captain, enabled his team to post a decent total with a controlled 57 as the rest of the top order failed to shine. Wickets fell steadily with Brendan Taylor's part-time offspin proving particularly effective as he claimed 2 for 17 in four overs. Steve Tikolo provided some late impetus with a brisk 27, but in the end the total wasn't anywhere near being a challenge.

In the third-place playoff, the Tuskers defeated the Rocks by a massive nine-wickets with Charles Coventry leading the way with 67* off 40 balls, and shared a 126-run partnership with Paul Horton who scored a half-century (56*) of his own. Victory was achieved with 10 balls spare.

In the final between Mash Eagles and Mid West Rhinos, Eagles sneaked through a thrilling contest by 1 run to become the second Stanbic Bank 20 Series Champion. Captain Grant Flower although he did not contribute to the runs as he was on the non-strikers end when the 20 overs were completed, on 0 not out, he led his team admirably to the field. Andrew Hall showed his all-round value with a 17-ball 39, which brought about the total. When Lou Vincent and captain Vusi Sibanda was in control of the Rhinos's run-chase and the result seemingly sealed, the experienced Flower who had long county stints with Essex County Cricket Club brought his spinners, Greg Lamb and Ray Price, and that brought about immediate results. Rhinos collapsed into a 1-run defeat. A quality crowd had come to see the match, and they had got exhilarating cricket.

And an unforgettable finish was made in an already memorable tournament when after the innings break in the final, Grant Flower was taken in a guard of honor as he left the field. As Flower later recalled it was a great way to finish off his career, and it had been a great tournament, with a great standard of cricket.

2011–12 season
 Champions: Mountaineers
 Runners-up: Mashonaland Eagles
 Official Website: Stanbic Bank 20 Series 2011/12
 Main Article: 2011–12 Stanbic Bank 20 Series
Zimbabwe Cricket was bullish ahead of the tournament, saying that it would face minimal monetary losses in the hosting of its Twenty20 tournament; ZC managing director Ozias Bvute saying "We will be very close to breaking even this year and we are not too far from making it a sustainable and profitable tournament,"

Mountaineers were crowned as the new champions, and with two titles became the most successful team in the history of the competition. International players Ryan ten Doeschate, Lou Vincent, Paul Horton, Liam Dawson and Andrew Hall were retained from the previous season. International players Chris Gayle (Matabeleland Tuskers), Dirk Nannes (Mountaineers), and Australian fast bowler Shaun Tait (Mid West Rhinos) were all signed for the tournament as well as other overseas players such as Peter Trego, Rory Hamilton-Brown, and Phil Mustard, with a total of 16 foreign players participating in the tournament.

The tournament kicked off on 25 November 2011 and saw both Njabulo Ncube and Natsai Mushangwe star as Mountaineers and Matabeleland Tuskers defeated Mid West Rhinos and Mashonaland Eagles respectively.

At the halfway stage, it seemed that Tuskers were the most dominant team and their strong side consisting international players unbalancing the tournament. However, the tournament changed when Mid West Rhinos defeated Matabeleland Tuskers, despite Chris Gayle scoring a rapid-fire century for the Tuskers. The Rhinos built on Brendan Taylor's unbeaten innings of 75 as they won by seven wickets. Southern Rocks had a forgettable tournament, finishing bottom of the pool, and thus not proceeding to the next stage. Mashonaland Eagles staged a comeback after losing all their initial matches they made it through to the playoff final by defeating Mid West Rhinos by 53 runs, against Matabeleland Tuskers. There they defeated the Tuskers by 23 runs (Duckworth–Lewis method) despite Chris Gayle's half-century, and another by Steven Trenchard, as they already had compiled a massive 207/7 thanks to Ryan ten Doeschate's 121* of 58.

Matabeleland had been consigned to the playoff final after they were earlier defeated by eventual champions Mountaineers at the 1st Semi. That was made possible by captain Hamilton Masakadza's 80*.

In the tournament final, the bowlers led Mountaineers to a remarkable victory. After Eagles restricted them to 142/6 (Phil Mustard 56), it seemed that Eagles would win the game (considering that they scored 207 in their playoff final match against the Tuskers), but Shingirai Masakadza took 3/21 in a remarkable spell to see out the Eagles for just 115 and secure victory by 27 runs. He received support from former captain Prosper Utseya, former New Zealand all-rounder Chris Harris, and international star Dirk Nannes.

2012–13 season
For the 2012–13 season, ZC has announced that in addition to the five local franchises, an additional four school teams will take part, which will add to the rivalry and competition. The two primary schools will be Ruwazi Primary School will face off against fellow opponents, Chipembere Primary School, while the two high schools will be Churchill High School and St. Georges. It will be a historic occasion as for the first time, youngsters can take center stage at a national event in the country and in a tournament which witnessed a record turnout in the final of the 2009–10 Stanbic Bank 20 Series. ZC announced this in a media release.

2017–18 season
For the 2017–18 season, The competition was scheduled to start in April 2018 and would have included a new team, the Rising Stars, along with the existing four teams. Two foreign teams were also expected to be included in the competition. Originally the T20 tournament was scheduled to open the Zimbabwean 2017–18 domestic calendar in September 2017, but it was moved back to April as it clashed with other T20 competitions being held.

Statistics and records

Winners

Performance of teams

Media and Broadcasting Rights

Sponsorship

 Stanbic Bank (Uganda) Limited currently sponsors the tournament.
 Metropolitan Bank and Trust Company were the former sponsors.

Broadcasting
 South Africa-based broadcaster SuperSport has bought the rights to the T20 tournament and all 14 matches will be screened live across the continent. The company has made a name for being one of the most comprehensive sports broadcasters in the world and secures rights to most major events. Clinton van der Berg, SuperSport communication manager, said they viewed the series as important to their African objectives. "SuperSport is a Pan-African broadcaster and Zimbabwe is one of our key areas," he said.
 Sometimes matches are also broadcast live on TEN Cricket, Ten Sports, and Zimbabwe Broadcasting Corporation (ZBC) as they are also broadcast sponsors of Zimbabwe Cricket.
 Apart from this live scores, bulletins, match reports, articles, and statistics are provided live in ESPNCricinfo, CricketArchive, Zimbabwe Cricket Official Website, etc.

Event Details
 Tournament tickets were available at a cheap cost of $10 for 9 days of cricket. Tournament tickets were available at the Stanbic Bank branches.

See also
 Zimbabwe national cricket team
 Zimbabwe Cricket
 2007–08 Metropolitan Bank Twenty20
 2009–10 Stanbic Bank 20 Series
 2010–11 Stanbic Bank 20 Series
 2011–12 Stanbic Bank 20 Series

External links
 Stanbic Bank Pro20
 Stanbic Bank 20 Series Zimbabwe
 Facebook Page
 Renewed Facebook Page
 Official Website

References

 
Professional sports leagues in Zimbabwe
Recurring sporting events established in 2007
Twenty20 cricket leagues
Zimbabwean domestic cricket competitions
2007 establishments in Zimbabwe
Professional cricket leagues